The mesometrium is the mesentery of the uterus. It constitutes the majority of the broad ligament of the uterus, excluding only the portions adjacent to the uterine tube (the mesosalpinx) and ovary (the mesovarium).

It is adjacent to the mesosalpinx.

The ureter is among the structures found in the mesometrium.

References

External links
 Image at wisc.edu

Mammal female reproductive system